Waua Islet is an island locality in the Torres Strait Island Region, Queensland, Australia. It consists of a single island, also called Waua Islet (also known as Wyer Island and Waier Island), one of the Murray Islands.

References 

Torres Strait Island Region
Localities in Queensland